Erika DeSalvatore is the acting Director of Visual Merchandising at Express. DeSalvatore is a buyer representing Express on NBC's Fashion Star, season 2.

References

Businesspeople from Columbus, Ohio
Mercyhurst University alumni
Fashion Institute of Technology alumni